Dekho Magar Pyaar Se is a 2004 Hindi language Indian soap opera that aired on Star Plus channel based on the story of a girl, Nikki. It is adapted from the Spanish series My Sweet Fat Valentina.

Overview
The series is a romantic comedy based on the emotions of a rather less than perfect figured girl Nikita Sareen. Everyone who knows the young Nikita Sareen, adores and loves her. Her beautiful spirit and sweet disposition makes up for her less-than-perfect physical appearance. Food is the salve that soothes her empty heart and nurtures her through the pain of having been exiled into boarding school at an early age. Just when fate seems to smile on her, tragedy strikes in form of her mother's accident and her mother, Sarika Sareen, succumbs to her injuries. Nikki is forced to live under the unbearable grip of her aunt Devyani, who tries everything in her power to rob Nikki off her inheritance.

Cast
 Shweta Agarwal / Shraddha Nigam as Nikita 
 Keith Sequeira as Karan
 Kushal Punjabi as Arjun
 Reena Kapoor as Kaya
 Priyanka Bassi as Tanya
 Amit Behl as Bobby Bedi
 Sushma Prakash as Tara Bedi
 Sudhir Pandey as Surender
 Manoj Bidwai as Abhi
 Aashish Kaul as Anil
 Anupam Bhattacharya as K.K.
 Anuradha Patel as Sarika
 Reena Wadhwa as Devyani
 Vaishnavi Mahant as Priyanka Maasi
 Malini Kapoor as Yaana
 Vishal Watwani as Sameer
 Rocky Verma as Baba Kidnapper
 Addite Shirwaikar

Production
The series was launched on 24 July 2004 at New Delhi.

References

External links
 
Dekho Magar Pyaar Se at Star Plus

Indian television soap operas
StarPlus original programming
2004 Indian television series debuts